Protection is a 1929 American pre-Code drama film directed by Benjamin Stoloff and written by Frederick Hazlitt Brennan. The film stars Dorothy Burgess, Robert Elliott, Paul Page, and Joe Brown. The film was released on May 5, 1929, by Fox Film Corporation.

Cast      
Dorothy Burgess as Myrtle Hines
Robert Elliott as Wallace Crockett
Paul Page as Chick Slater
Ben Hewlett as James Rollans
Dorothy Ward as Judy Revis
Joe Brown as Joe Brown
Roy Stewart as Ollie Bogardt
William H. Tooker as Harry Lamson

References

External links
 

1929 films
1920s English-language films
1929 drama films
Fox Film films
Films directed by Benjamin Stoloff
American black-and-white films
1920s American films